Verlorene Siege (English: Lost Victories; full title of English edition: Lost Victories: The War Memoirs of Hitler's Most Brilliant General) is the personal narrative of Erich von Manstein, a German field marshal during World War II. The book was first published in West Germany in 1955, then in Spain in 1956. Its English translation was published in 1958 for distribution in the UK and the US.

Many historians have called Verlorene Siege unreliable and apologetic. German historian Volker Berghahn wrote about the book, "Its title gave the story away: it had been Hitler's dogmatism and constant interference with the strategic plans and operational decisions of the professionals that had cost Germany its victory against Stalin".

Analysis of themes

On the Red Army
Manstein portrayed the average Soviet soldier as courageous but poorly led. Depicting the Soviet officer corps as hopelessly incompetent, he portrayed the war on the Eastern Front as a German army vastly superior in fighting ability being steadily ground down by an opponent superior only in numbers. According to The Myth of the Eastern Front by Ronald Smelser and Edward J. Davies, that aspect of Verlorene Siege was self-serving, as it allowed Manstein to ignore several occasions, such as the fall of Kiev in November 1943, in which he was deceived and defeated by the Stavka.

On German generals
Manstein disparaged other German generals, portraying them as incompetent. Manstein took the credit for German victories and blamed Hitler and his fellow generals for every defeat. His arch-enemy was General Franz Halder; according to Manstein, although Halder understood that Hitler's leadership was defective, he lacked the courage to do anything about it. Smelser and Davies also called Manstein's criticism of Hitler self-serving. The general falsely claimed that he wanted the 6th Army to be pulled out of Stalingrad after it was encircled, only to be overruled by Hitler, and attacked Hitler for launching Operation Citadel, a plan developed by Manstein himself for execution months earlier, before the buildup of Soviet defenses.

Absence of politics and war crimes
Manstein avoided political issues, treating the war as an operational matter. He expressed no regret for serving a genocidal regime, and nowhere in Verlorene Siege did Manstein condemn National Socialism on moral grounds; Hitler was criticized only for faulty strategic decisions. Manstein's lament for Germany's "lost victories" in the Second World War implied that the world would have benefited from a Nazi victory. Manstein, falsely claiming that he did not enforce the Commissar Order, omitted any mention of his role in the Holocaust, such as sending 2,000 of his soldiers to help the SS massacre 11,000 Jews in Simferopol in November 1941.

Reception

Moral perspective
After Verlorene Siege was published, the West German newspaper Die Zeit asked about Manstein's account: "What would it have signified for the world and for Germany, what would it have signified for a Christian and gentleman like Manstein if these victories had not been lost?" German historian Jürgen Förster wrote in 1998 that for too long, most Germans accepted at face value self-serving claims by generals such as Manstein and Siegfried Westphal in their memoirs that the Wehrmacht was a professional, apolitical force who were victims (not followers) of Adolf Hitler; these evaded the issue of Wehrmacht war crimes. 

In 2004, historian Volker Berghahn called Manstein's memoirs "totally unreliable"; if more had been known about his war crimes during the 1940s, he might have been hanged. According to Berghahn, "By the time Christian Streit published his book Keine Kameraden about the mass murder of Red Army prisoners of war at the hands of the Wehrmacht, professional historians firmly accepted what Manstein and his comrades had denied and covered up, i.e., that the Wehrmacht had been deeply involved in the criminal and genocidal policies of the Nazi regime". Historians Ronald Smelser and Edward J. Davies noted that nowhere in his memoirs or other post-war writings did Manstein explicitly condemn National Socialism. Max Egremont called the memoir "arrogant" and "self-serving" in Literary Review, Andrew Roberts wrote in The Storm of War that it has "rightly been condemned".

Operational perspective
In the preface to Lost Victories, military historian and officer Martin Blumenson wrote that Verlorene Siege was "the best book of memoirs on the German side and it is indispensable for understanding the conditions and circumstances of Hitler’s war." Military historian Robert M. Citino found its operational details useful, but criticized Manstein for "defending his generalship and reputation, hiding his participation in war crimes, and blaming others for everything that went wrong": Citino wrote, "Lost Victories should come with a warning label: Use with Caution."

See also 
 Manstein Plan
 Clean Wehrmacht

References

Sources

External links 
  at the Internet Archive
 , a review of Lost Victories
 Revisiting a Lost Victory at Kursk

World War II memoirs
1955 non-fiction books
German non-fiction books
Propaganda legends